Billions of Entrepreneurs is a book by Harvard Business School professor, Tarun Khanna. It was published in 2008 by Harvard Business School Press.

The book provides an analysis of China and India, and explains how these two emerging Asian economies are reshaping the global economy in the 21st century.

Brief summary

See also
 Tarun Khanna

External links
 Harvard Business Press Book | Billions of Entrepreneurs

References

2008 non-fiction books
Business books